Narjamandap is a village development committee in Nuwakot District in the Bagmati Zone of central Nepal. At the time of the 2011 Nepal census it had a population of 5,335 people living in 1012 individual households.

References

External links
UN map of the municipalities of Nuwakot District

Populated places in Nuwakot District